Kingston is an unincorporated community in Shoshone County, Idaho, United States.

Kingston has a post office with ZIP code 83839.

History
Kingston's population was estimated at 350 in 1909, and was estimated at 500 in 1960.

References

Unincorporated communities in Shoshone County, Idaho
Unincorporated communities in Idaho